Weeks is the plural of "week".  It can also refer to:

People
 Weeks (surname), including a list of notable people with the surname

Places in the United States
 Weeks, Arkansas, an unincorporated community
 Mount Weeks, a mountain in New Hampshire
 Weeks Falls, a waterfall on the Snoqualmie River, Washington

Ships
 , a United States Navy destroyer escort cancelled in 1944
 , a United States Navy destroyer in commission from 1944 to 1970

Other uses
 Weeks v. United States, a United States Supreme Court case
 Weeks Field, the first airport for Fairbanks, Alaska, from 1923 to 1951
 Weeks Marine, an American marine construction and dredging contractor
 Shavuot, also called the Festival of Weeks
 The Weeks (band), an American indie rock band
 Baron Weeks, a British title held only by Ronald Weeks, 1st Baron Weeks (1890–1960) 
 John W. Weeks Bridge, also known as the Weeks Footbridge or Bridge, a pedestrian bridge over the Charles River, Massachusetts, United States
 Johnny Weeks, a fictional character on the television series The Wire

See also
 Weeks Act, an American federal law enacted in 1911
 Weeks House (disambiguation)
 Weeks Estate, a country estate in Lancaster, New Hampshire, United States, now the Weeks State Park
 Weeks Cemetery, Marlborough, Massachusetts, United States, on the National Register of Historic Places
 Weeks 533, a large floating crane
 Week (disambiguation)
 Weekes (disambiguation)
 Wicks (disambiguation)